Kutch (also spelled as Kachchh or Cutch) generally refers to the Kutch district, a district of Gujarat state in western India. It may also refer to:

Geography

Kutch district
 Kutch (Lok Sabha constituency), Indian parliamentary constituency
 Gulf of Kutch, inlet of the Arabian Sea along the west coast of India
 Rann of Kutch, salt marsh located on the western tip of Gujarat, India and the Sindh province of Pakistan
 Little Rann of Kutch, salt marsh in Kutch, Gujarat, India, located near the Great Rann of Kutch
 Great Rann of Kutch, seasonal salt marsh located in the Thar Desert in the Kutch district of Gujarat, India and the Sindh province of Pakistan
 Rann of Kutch Wildlife Sanctuary, wildlife sanctuary in Kutch, Gujarat, India 
 Kutch Bustard Sanctuary, bird sanctuary in Kutch, Gujarat, India
 Kutch Desert Wildlife Sanctuary, wildlife sanctuary in Kutch, Gujarat, India

Former polities in the district
 Kutch State, a state within the Republic of India from 1947 to 1956
 Cutch State, a relatively large Indian princely state during the British Raj
 Kutch kori, obsolete Indian currency 
 Cutch Agency, an agency of British India that looked after the princely state of Cutch

Other places
 Kutch, Colorado, U.S.
 Kutch Lacuna, large intermittent lake on Titan

Others
 Kutch embroidery, handicraft and textile art tradition of Kutch, Gujarat, India
 Kachchh shawl, Indian handloom shawl from Kutch
 Krantiguru Shyamji Krishna Verma Kachchh University or Kutch University, university in Kutch, India
 Kutch Museum, history and art museum in Kutch, Gujarat, India
 Kutch Express, Indian daily express train
 Kutch Express (film), Indian film by Viral Shah
 Kutch Mitra, Gujarati-language newspaper published from Kutch, India

See also
 Cutch (disambiguation)
 Kutchi (disambiguation)